is a Japanese football player. He plays for Azul Claro Numazu.

Playing career
Jun Suzuki played for SC Sagamihara from 2012 to 2014. He moved to Azul Claro Numazu in 2015.

Club statistics
Updated to 23 February 2018.

References

External links
Profile at Azul Claro Numazu

1987 births
Living people
Kanagawa University alumni
Association football people from Kanagawa Prefecture
Japanese footballers
J3 League players
Japan Football League players
SC Sagamihara players
Azul Claro Numazu players
Tokyo 23 FC players
Association football forwards